Peter Pan & Wendy is an upcoming American fantasy adventure film directed by David Lowery from a screenplay he co-wrote with Toby Halbrooks. Jim Whitaker served as producer on the Walt Disney Pictures production, which is a live-action adaptation of Walt Disney's 1953 animated film Peter Pan, in turn based on the 1904 play Peter Pan; or, the Boy Who Wouldn't Grow Up (also known as Peter and Wendy) by J. M. Barrie. The film stars Alexander Molony (in his film debut) and Ever Anderson in the title roles. Jude Law, Yara Shahidi, Alyssa Wapanatâhk, Joshua Pickering, Jacobi Jupe, Molly Parker, Alan Tudyk, and Jim Gaffigan also appear in supporting roles.

Development on a live-action Peter Pan film began on April 13, 2016, with Lowery directing. Lowery was announced as writing the film with Halbrooks, while the production team expanded the next four years due to work in the remake's script. The film's title was announced on January 7, 2020. Production was expected to begin in April 2020 and wrap in August that year but was delayed due to the COVID-19 pandemic. Filming ultimately began in March 2021 in Vancouver, British Columbia. Shooting also occurred on the Bonavista Peninsula of Newfoundland and Labrador, in August 2021. Reshoots took place in Vancouver, from February 2 to 8, 2022.

Peter Pan & Wendy is set to premiere on Disney+ on April 28, 2023.

Premise 
Wendy Darling, a young girl afraid to leave her childhood home behind, meets Peter Pan, a boy who refuses to grow up. Alongside her brothers and a tiny fairy, Tinker Bell, she travels with Peter to the magical world of Neverland. There, Wendy encounters an evil pirate captain, Captain Hook, and embarks on a thrilling and dangerous adventure that will change her life forever.

Cast 
 Alexander Molony as Peter Pan, a young boy who lives in Neverland and refuses to grow up.
 Ever Anderson as Wendy Darling, an adventurous and virtuous girl from London who travels with her little brothers John and Michael and Peter to Neverland.
 Jude Law as Captain Hook, a pirate and Peter's archenemy who developed a vendetta towards Peter for cutting off his right hand and feeding it to a crocodile who has since developed a taste for his flesh replacing his hand with a hook. In contrast to the original play, by Barrie, 1904's "Peter Pan, or The Boy Who Wouldn't Grow Up" and later Peter Pan adaptations, which have Hook share the same actor as George Darling, the role will be performed by a separate actor instead of Alan Tudyk.
 Yara Shahidi as Tinker Bell, a hyperactive fairy and Peter's best friend who is jealous of Wendy.
 Joshua Pickering as John Darling, Wendy's little brother and Michael's older brother who travels with them and Peter to Neverland.
 Jacobi Jupe as Michael Darling, Wendy and John's little brother who travels with them and Peter to Neverland.
 Alyssa Wapanatahk as Tiger Lily, a warrior princess of Neverland's indigenous tribe and the daughter of the chief who is Peter's friend. Wendy is slightly jealous of her believing that she has a crush on Peter.
 Jim Gaffigan as Mr. Smee, Captain Hook's loyal first mate who does not always offer much help.
 Molly Parker as Mary Darling, Wendy, John, and Michael's mother from London.
 Alan Tudyk as George Darling, Wendy, John, and Michael's father from London who works as a bank accountant. In contrast to the original film and most Peter Pan adaptations, which have George share the same actor as Captain Hook, the role will be performed by a separate actor instead of Jude Law.
 Noah Matthews Matofsky as Slightly, a lost boy.
 Sebastian Billingsley-Rodriguez as Nibs, a lost boy.
 Skyler and Kelsey Yates as Tudy and Rudy, twin lost girls.
 Florence Bensberg as Curly, a lost girl.
 Caelan Edie as Tootles, a lost boy.
 Diana Tsoy as Birdie, a new lost girl.
 Felix De Sousa as Bellweather, a new lost boy.

Production

Development and pre-production 
In April 2016, it was announced that Walt Disney Pictures was developing a live-action adaptation of the 1953 animated film, Peter Pan. David Lowery signed on as director, with a script he co-wrote with Toby Halbrooks. The pair previously worked together on the 2016 remake of Disney's Pete's Dragon. Jim Whitaker will serve as producer on the project.

In February 2018, Whitaker stated that the script was entering early stages of development. He further explained that the film will be grounded in realism, though it will also be "a big, rollicking adventure, too". By October of the same year, the fourth draft of the script had been completed with a fifth draft underway. Lowery stated that "the number-one priority is getting the script right". The filmmaker elaborated that the project is personal to him, as he is a fan to the original, acknowledging that he had been "agonizing over every little detail". He confirmed that the modern-day adaptation would have to change elements to avoid the racial stereotypes present in the original film.

In December 2019, Lowery stated that he and Halbrooks had written an additional "draft-and-a-half" at that point, adding that it would have to have "a few more drafts to go" before it is ready to be filmed. He described working on the film as "challenging" due to both his personal love for the original film and its popularity among fans. He also feels that he had to justify the film's existence due to other live-action Peter Pan films having been developed, while also doing "justice to the source material". The filmmaker stated that the outlook that he and the studio has, is: "[i]f it has to be done, it has to be done right". Comparing his work on Peter Pan to Pete's Dragon, the filmmaker stated that the latter was less stress seeing as the original had been an "under-the-radar Disney title" with little following, which allowed him more creative freedom. By 2020, the film was officially titled Peter Pan & Wendy. Joe Roth joined the film's production team as an additional producer.

Casting 
Alexander Molony and Ever Anderson were reported to have been cast as Peter Pan and Wendy Darling, respectively, in March 2020. By July of the same year, Jude Law had entered early negotiations to play Captain James Hook. Law would be confirmed in September, with Yara Shahidi cast to play Tinker Bell. In October 2020, Alyssa Wapanatâhk was confirmed to play Tiger Lily. In January 2021, Jim Gaffigan joined the cast as Mr. Smee. On March 16, 2021, Alan Tudyk, Molly Parker, Joshua Pickering, and Jacobi Jupe were announced to play Mr. Darling, Mrs. Darling, John Darling, and Michael Darling, respectively, as principal photography officially began.

Filming 
Production for Peter Pan & Wendy took place in Vancouver, British Columbia. It was originally set to begin on April 17, 2020, and wrap in August 2020 but filming was delayed due to the COVID-19 pandemic. Filming began on March 16, 2021. Additional filming took place on the Bonavista Peninsula of Newfoundland and Labrador, in August 2021. Reshoots took place in Vancouver, from February 2 to 8, 2022.

Visual effects 
The visual effects will be handled by Framestore and DNEG.

Release 
The film was originally set to be released on Disney's streaming service, Disney+ but was later scheduled to be released theatrically, until in December 2020, the film was officially announced to be released as a Disney+ exclusive again due to the COVID-19 pandemic. The film is scheduled to be released on Disney+ on April 28, 2023.

See also 
 Peter and Wendy
 Peter Pan (1953)
 Peter Pan (2003)
 List of Disney live-action adaptations and remakes of Disney animated films

References

External links 
 

2023 adventure films
2023 fantasy films
2020s American films
2020s English-language films
2020s fantasy adventure films
American fantasy adventure films
Disney+ original films
Film productions suspended due to the COVID-19 pandemic
Films about child abduction
Films about children
Films about fairies and sprites
Films based on adaptations
Films directed by David Lowery
Films produced by Joe Roth
Films not released in theaters due to the COVID-19 pandemic
Films scored by Daniel Hart
Films set in London
Films shot in Canada
Films shot in British Columbia
Films shot in Newfoundland and Labrador
Films shot in Vancouver
Live-action films based on Disney's animated films
Peter Pan (franchise)
Peter Pan films
Upcoming English-language films
Walt Disney Pictures films